The 1968 Boston Red Sox season was the 68th season in the franchise's Major League Baseball history. The Red Sox finished fourth in the American League (AL) with a record of 86 wins and 76 losses, 17 games behind the AL and World Series champion Detroit Tigers.

Offseason 
 October 29, 1968: Elston Howard was released by the Red Sox.

Regular season 
Carl Yastrzemski set an American League record by having the lowest batting average to win a batting title. Yaz hit .301 to claim the batting title.

Season standings

Record vs. opponents

Opening Day lineup

Notable transactions 
 August 7, 1968: Norm Siebern was released by the Red Sox.
 August 14, 1968: Galen Cisco was purchased from the Red Sox by the Kansas City Royals.

Roster

Player stats

Batting

Starters by position 
Note: Pos = Position; G = Games played; AB = At bats; H = Hits; Avg. = Batting average; HR = Home runs; RBI = Runs batted in

Other batters 
Note: G = Games played; AB = At bats; H = Hits; Avg. = Batting average; HR = Home runs; RBI = Runs batted in

Pitching

Starting pitchers 
Note: G = Games pitched; IP = Innings pitched; W = Wins; L = Losses; ERA = Earned run average; SO = Strikeouts

Other pitchers 
Note: G = Games pitched; IP = Innings pitched; W = Wins; L = Losses; ERA = Earned run average; SO = Strikeouts

Relief pitchers 
Note: G = Games pitched; W = Wins; L = Losses; SV = Saves; ERA = Earned run average; SO = Strikeouts

Awards and honors 
George Scott, Gold Glove Award (1B)
Reggie Smith, Gold Glove Award (OF)
Carl Yastrzemski, Gold Glove Award (OF)

Farm system 

Source:

References

External links
1968 Boston Red Sox team page at Baseball Reference
1968 Boston Red Sox season at baseball-almanac.com

Boston Red Sox seasons
Boston Red Sox
Boston Red Sox
1960s in Boston